Snyder Creek is a river in Otsego County, New York. It converges with Pleasant Brook east-northeast of Pleasant Brook.

References

Rivers of New York (state)
Rivers of Otsego County, New York